Botched is a 2007 horror comedy film directed by Kit Ryan and starring Stephen Dorff.  It is an international co-production between Australia, the UK, Germany, Ireland, and the US.  Dorff plays a thief who, when he botches a robbery for his boss, is forced to steal an heirloom from a Russian penthouse.  After he and two Russian accomplices (played by Jamie Foreman and Russell Smith) take several hostages, they realize the heirloom is guarded by a crazy serial killer, who begins killing off both criminals and hostages indiscriminately.

Plot
Richie Donovan works as a professional thief for Groznyi, a wealthy businessman, to pay off his debt for being smuggled into the U.S. as a child. He pulls off an initially successful diamond heist, but it is botched when he is involved in two separate car accidents. He is given one last chance to pay off his debt by going to Russia to steal a priceless antique cross, locked in a safe in a Moscow penthouse apartment. Richie and his Russian accomplices, brothers Peter and Yuri, recover the cross; but their elevator becomes stuck on the uncompleted 13th floor. Believing the police have stopped the elevator, the thieves take their fellow passengers hostage to negotiate an escape. They agree to send one hostage down; but, when the elevator doors open on the ground floor, the hostage has mysteriously been beheaded.

The remaining hostages quickly divide into two groups: a Christian group consisting of Sonya, Helena and Katerina, who are later joined by Yuri, and another group consisting of nerdy Dmitry, beautiful Anna, and incompetent security guard Boris.

In the confusion, the Christian group seizes firearms and takes control, shooting Peter. Katerina is sent to stand guard over Richie and the remainder of the hostages, while Sonya takes Yuri to a chamber where he is to sacrificed by a wild man in armor named Alex. Yuri escapes, but he is impaled by one of Alex's traps, complete with disco music and lighting. In his rage, Alex kills Katerina, allowing Richie and the hostages to escape. They discover Alex's lair, where he has been watching everyone using security cameras. A photo reveals that Alex is the twin brother of Sonya, and they both believe themselves to be descendants of Ivan the Terrible. The group splits when Richie and Anna decide to chase after Alex, while Boris and Dmitry prefer to rig the room with various traps they have constructed and wait for Alex to come to them.

Richie and Anna manage to drive off Alex, though Richie is wounded and Anna loses part of her ear. Instead Alex confronts Boris and Dmitry, and starts chasing them through the building when their traps fail to deploy. Dmitry gets caught in his own snare, making him an easy target for Alex, while Sonya dupes Boris into deploying a malfunctioning trap, cutting his hand off. Boris cauterizes his arm but is also injected with a serum that restricts facial movement.

Alex drags Peter's body into his lair for a sacrifice. In doing so, he finds the cross and takes it for himself. Richie and Anna then unsuccessfully search Peter for the cross, only to discover that Peter miraculously survived the shooting. Alex is then attacked from three sides by Peter, Richie and an increasingly incoherent Boris. Though Alex easily kills Peter, Richie manages to impale him on his disco spikes, recovers the cross, then sets him on fire. As they are fleeing the building, Richie is strangled by Sonya, but Anna saves him by stabbing Sonya with her nail file. Security is alerted by Alex's body falling onto the floor below, allowing Richie and Anna to escape unencumbered.

Outside, they are met by Groznyi, who pays Richie handsomely for his work. Richie is enraged, having discovered that Grozniy is the brother of Sonya and Alex, and tells him that he will never work for him again; Grozniy replies that Richie will be back. Richie and Anna then depart for Los Angeles.

Cast

Reception

Botched holds an approval rating of 25% on Rotten Tomatoes based on eight reviews, with an average rating of 4.2/10.

The film has received praise from Shock Till You Drop, and Dread Central praised it for "[treating] its audience with intelligence".

Awards
 Best Feature Film at the 2007 New York City Horror Film Festival
 Best Actor for Stephen Dorff at the 2007 New York City Horror Film Festival

References

External links
 
 Official website

2007 films
2007 horror films
2007 comedy horror films
American comedy horror films
British comedy horror films
German comedy horror films
Irish comedy horror films
English-language German films
English-language Irish films
Australian serial killer films
British serial killer films
Australian comedy horror films
2007 comedy films
2000s English-language films
2000s American films
2000s British films
2000s German films